Evert Bancker may refer to:

Evert Bancker (speaker) (1721–1803), American merchant and politician, speaker of the New York state assembly
Evert Bancker (mayor) (1665–1734), American trader and politician, mayor of Albany